Laity Moor is a village  north-west of Penryn in Cornwall, England. The name derives from the Cornish "goon lety" meaning "dairy downs". (Laity is thought to mean "dairy", from "lait" meaning "milk", and "-ty", meaning "house".) The Laity family come from there. It is in the civil parish of St Gluvias.

The former Methodist chapel at Laity Moor has served as the Orthodox Church of Archangel Michael and Holy Piran since 1996.

References

Villages in Cornwall